Thomas Jefferson DuBose (1902 – February 24, 1992) was a brigadier general in the United States Air Force who served as chief of staff of the 8th Air Force. 
A veteran of World War II and the Korean War, Dubose was awarded the Legion of Merit and the Bronze Star.

Early life
DuBose was born in 1902 in San Antonio, Texas.  In 1922, he graduated Central High School in Oklahoma City, DuBoose attended the University of Oklahoma from 1923 until 1924.  He enrolled at the United States Military Academy, graduating on June 13, 1929.

Military career
Upon receiving his commission as a second lieutenant in the Army, in September 1929,  DuBose attended primary flying school at March Field, Calif. He graduated from the Advanced Flying School at Kelly Field, Texas and was transferred to the Army Air Corps on March 14, 1931.  He remained at Kelly Field until June, serving as a flight instructor.
In the summer of 1931, DuBose joined the 3rd Pursuit Squadron in the Philippines.

Training corps
In 1934, DuBose, now a first lieutenant, returned to Kelly Field as a flight instructor.

In June 1939,  DuBose was promoted to the rank of captain.   In 1940, he became director of training at Moffett Field, California, and was promoted to major. In October 1941, he became director of training at Merced, California and was promoted to lieutenant colonel.  The following year he was promoted to colonel and appointed "chief of Flying Training Section" at the Headquarters of the U.S. Army Air Forces

Pacific Command
In December 1944, he took command of the 316th Bomb Wing at Colorado Springs, Colorado.  In July 1945, the wing deployed to the Asia-Pacific theater.   On September 2, 1945, the Empire of Japan formally surrendered, ending the Second World War.

In January 1946, DuBose was appointed assistant chief of staff for plans of the Pacific Air Command at Manila.

Strategic Air Command

In June 1946, DuBose became deputy assistant chief of staff for operations of Strategic Air Command at Bolling Field, Washington, D.C.

From August to October 1946 he commanded the advance headquarters echelon of Strategic Air Command at Colorado Springs.  He served as assistant chief of staff for personnel, chief of staff and deputy commander of the 8th Air Force at Fort Worth.

When, in 1947, the US Air Force became a separate branch of the military, DuBose became a member of the Air Force.

In February 1948, Du Bose became deputy commander of Air Task Group 7.4, the Air Force part of Joint Task Force 7, a unit that "constructed a proving ground for the Atomic Energy Commission at Eniwetok and later assisted the Atomic Energy Commission in the conduct of the first series of tests of atomic weapons."

In May 1948, DuBose became Chief of Staff of the 8th Air Force.

In August 1948, he entered the National War College, graduating the following June.  In August 1949, DuBose assumed command of the 1602nd Air Transport Wing at Wiesbaden, Germany.
On August 13, 1952, DuBose took command of Air Rescue Service, and on Aug. 17 he was promoted to the rank of brigadier general.

In 1959, DuBose retired from the Air Force, residing in Winter Park, Florida.

Personal life
In June 1958, DuBose and his wife Rose celebrated the birth of a daughter.  The couple also had a son. DuBose was a member of First United Methodist Church.

DuBose died on February 24, 1992, at the age of 89.

External links
 Official USAF biography

References

Recipients of the Legion of Merit
Personnel of Strategic Air Command
United States Air Force generals
1902 births
1992 deaths
United States Military Academy alumni